Caenolyda is a genus of insect belonging to the family Pamphiliidae.

The genus was first described by Konow in 1897.

The species of this genus are found in Europe.

Species:
 Caenolyda reticulata (Linnaeus, 1758)

References

Pamphiliidae
Sawfly genera